Socialist Resistance (SR) is a Trotskyist organisation in Britain. In 2009, the International Socialist Group (ISG) merged into it, making it the British Section of the Fourth International.

Origins
It was launched in 2002 by two organisations, the Socialist Solidarity Network (SSN) and International Socialist Group (ISG), and 33 individuals.

Organisation
Founded as a network it developed the norms of an organisation, included elected bodies, local groups and formal membership. By 2007 135 activists had subscribed to its internal listserver, of whom around at least 65 could be assumed to have been members of the ISG; and at least 20 of whom were supporters of the SSN. Its members also include former supporters in Britain of the Democratic Socialist Perspective.

In 2009, Socialist Resistance adopted a constitution and a more extensive political basis. The organisation is controlled by an occasional conference to which one delegate is elected for every three members. It elects a National Committee and an Appeals Committee (a control commission). The National Committee appoints sub-committees, including an executive and an editorial board.

Activities
It organises monthly public meetings in London, Oxford and Birmingham, as well as national open forums each year. For example, it organised a June 2006 dayschool on the Bolivarian revolution addressed by Michael Löwy and Celia Hart, a September 2006 annual general meeting,  December 2006 and May 2007 forums on "ecosocialism" and a March 2007 forum on the Middle East.

In September 2009 Socialist Resistance, together with Green Left, organised a seminar on Climate and Capitalism, with Ian Angus as the main speaker.

Socialist Resistance also publishes irregular broadsheets and pamphlets. Three leading activists in Socialist Resistance are on the editorial board of International Viewpoint. Socialist Resistance also cooperates with Green Left and the Red-Green Study Group in the Ecosocialist International Network.

After resigning from Respect, Socialist Resistance became part of the Trade Union and Socialist Coalition from which it withdrew in mid-2014.

The organisation welcomed the launch of Left Unity, in which its members played an active part. However, following the election of Jeremy Corbyn as leader of the Labour Party in September 2015 most SR members, together with others, left Left Unity to join the Labour Party.

In January 2014 Socialist Resistance unsuccessfully entered unity talks with Workers' Power and the International Socialist Network with a view to "dissolve itself into a new organisation and its only condition would be that its members could remain in the Fourth International."

Student members of Socialist Resistance are active in the National Campaign Against Fees and Cuts, a broad student organisation that campaigns for the abolition of tuition fees.

Socialist Resistance endorsed the Labour Party in the 2019 United Kingdom general election.

Publications 

Resistance Books is the publishing arm of Socialist Resistance. Resistance Books also publishes books jointly with Merlin Press (London) and the International Institute for Research and Education (Amsterdam).

Periodical 

Also known as Socialist Resistance, the rationale for the new publication was "to express and build support for a distinct political position which, despite differences among us on secondary issues, we share. We want to deepen the fight for a broad socialist party in England on the model of, for example, the SSP in Scotland and the Party of Communist Refoundation in Italy."

Between September 2002 and November 2007 it produced 49 issues of a 28-page tabloid which was produced monthly, with summer and winter issues spanning two months each. In November 2007, the resources used for the newspaper were dedicated to the Respect Renewal movement, allowing it to plan the launch of a newspaper in December 2007. According to a statement by the group's Steering Committee, the change was unanimously agreed at a meeting of the group's members. In January 2008, the group's aggregate agreed to relaunch Socialist Resistance as a colour quarterly magazine in April 2008. It ceased publication in 2014, but continues in an online version.

See also 
 List of political parties in the United Kingdom opposed to austerity

References

External links
Socialist Resistance
International Socialist Group
Resistance books blog

2002 establishments in the United Kingdom
Eco-socialism
Feminist parties in the United Kingdom
Fourth International
Socialist magazines
Political magazines published in the United Kingdom
Trotskyist organisations in the United Kingdom
Magazines established in 2002
Socialist feminist organizations
Quarterly magazines published in the United Kingdom
Feminist magazines